David John Henderson  (14 May 1877 – 1 January 1957) was an American silent film actor.

Jack Henderson was born on 14 May 1877 or 1878 in Syracuse, New York.

Henderson acted with Charlie Chaplin at Essanay Studios in Los Angeles from October 1915, and continued with him at Mutual.

Henderson died on 1 January 1957 in New York City.

Partial filmography
Burlesque on Carmen (1915)
A Dash of Courage (1916)
A Royal Rogue (1917)
Scars and Bars (1918)
Hearts in Hock (1919)
A Roman Scandal (1919)
Jiggs in Society (1920)
The Phantom Fortune (1923)
The Foolish Virgin (1924)
 A Captain's Courage (1926)
 Thunderbolt's Tracks (1927)
 Tracked (1928)
Taking a Chance (1928)
Little Men (1940)

References

External links
 
 ibdb.com

1870s births
1957 deaths
American male silent film actors
20th-century American male actors
Male actors from Syracuse, New York